Events from the year 1802 in Denmark.

Incumbents
 Monarch – Christian VII
 Prime minister – Christian Günther von Bernstorff

Events
 April  The British occupation of the Danish West Indies ends.
 4 May – The Golden Horns of Gallehus are stolen.

Undated

 A Panoramic painting of the Battle of Copenhagen created by Heinrich August Grosch (1763-1843) is on public display in a purpose-built wooden rotunda ay present-day Sølvgade 20–22 in Copenhagen. In 1800,

Births
 21 April  Wilhelm Wanscher, businessman and art collector (died 1882)
 27 July  Hans Jonatan, opera singer and composer (died 1858)
 19 September – Frederik Theodor Kloss, painter (died 1876)

Deaths
 13 February – Jakob Edvard Colbjørnsen, chief justice (born 1744)
 8 February – Søren Gyldendal, bookstore owner, publisher (born 1742)
 24 August – Niels Ditlev Riegels, historian, journalist and pamphleteer (born 1755)
 4 October – Niels Brock, merchant (born 1731)
 16 September  Christian Joseph Zuber, architect (born 1736)
 17 December – Johannes Wiedewelt, sculptor (born 1731)
 27 December – Jens Juel, painter (born 1745)

References

See also

 
1800s in Denmark
Years of the 19th century in Denmark